José Romero Jiménez (born 23 January 1985), commonly known as Joselito, is a Spanish footballer who plays for Riotinto Balompié as a forward.

Football career
Born in Zalamea la Real, Province of Huelva, Joselito all but spent his career in the Spanish lower leagues. In the 2008–09 season he appeared in four competitive matches with local club Recreativo de Huelva as a substitute, playing in La Liga in the 1–0 away win against Real Betis and the 0–1 home loss to RCD Espanyol.

References

External links

1985 births
Living people
Sportspeople from the Province of Huelva
Spanish footballers
Footballers from Andalusia
Association football forwards
La Liga players
Segunda División players
Segunda División B players
Tercera División players
Divisiones Regionales de Fútbol players
Atlético Onubense players
Recreativo de Huelva players
Racing de Ferrol footballers
Real Jaén footballers
Cultural Leonesa footballers
UE Vilajuïga footballers
CD Guijuelo footballers
La Roda CF players